This is a list of published titles in the Christian fiction genre, some recently published, some best-sellers.

Christian fiction books

Action/adventure
 The Stonegate Sword - Harry James Fox
 The Legacy - A Suspense Novel - Ralph Nelson Willett
 The Release - Escape from Torment - Ralph Nelson Willett

Historical
 Dreaming in Egypt-The Story of Asenath & Joseph - Maria Isabel Pita
 Temperance's Trial; Virtues and Valor Part 1 - Hallee Bridgeman
 Homeland's Hope; Virtues and Valor Part 2 - Hallee Bridgeman
 Charity's Code; Virtues and Valor Part 3 - Hallee Bridgeman
 A Parcel for Prudence; Virtues and Valor Part 4 - Hallee Bridgeman
 Grace's Ground War; Virtues and Valor Part 5 - Hallee Bridgeman
 Mission of Mercy; Virtues and Valor Part 6 - Hallee Bridgeman
 Flight of Faith; Virtues and Valor Part 7 - Hallee Bridgeman
 Valor's Vigil; Virtues and Valor Part 8 -  Hallee Bridgeman
 Brendan - Frederick Buechner
 Godric - Frederick Buechner
 Dear and Glorious Physician - Taylor Caldwell
 The Red Tent - Anita Diamant
 Demon: A Memoir - Tosca Lee
 Havah: The Story of Eve - Tosca Lee
 Under Penalty of Death – Kristena Mears
 The Last Sin Eater - Francine Rivers
 The Prince - Francine Rivers
 Redeeming Love – Francine Rivers

Contemporary
 Gospel: a novel - Wilton Barnhardt 
 Sapphire Ice; The Jewel Series Part 1 - Hallee Bridgeman
 Greater Than Rubies; The Jewel Series Part 1.5 - Hallee Bridgeman
 Emerald Fire; The Jewel Series Part 2 - Hallee Bridgeman
 Topaz Heat; The Jewel Series Part 3 -  Hallee Bridgeman
 Christmas Diamond; a Jewel Series novella - Hallee Bridgeman
 Christmas Star Sapphire; a Jewel Series novella -  Hallee Bridgeman
 A Melody for James; The Song of Suspense Series Part 1 -  Hallee Bridgeman
 An Aria for Nick; The Song of Suspense Song of Suspense Part 2 -  Hallee Bridgeman
 A Carol for Kent; The Song of Suspense Series Part 3 -  Hallee Bridgeman
 A Bridge Unbroken - Cathy Bryant
 Crossroads - Cathy Bryant
 A Path Less Traveled - Cathy Bryant
 Pilgrimage of Promise - Cathy Bryant
 Texas Roads - Cathy Bryant
 The Way of Grace -  Cathy Bryant
 Between Noon and Three: Romance, Law, and the Outrage of Grace - Robert Farrar Capon
 Exit 36: A Fictional Chronicle - Robert Farrar Capon
 The Man Who Met God in a Bar: The Gospel According to Marvin: A Novel - Robert Farrar Capon
 Divine - Karen Kingsbury
 The Atonement Child - Francine Rivers
 The Monkey Bible - Mark Laxer
 The Shack - William P. Young
 Cross Road(novel) - William P. Young
 Eve - William P. Young
 The God Whistle - Ralph Nelson Willett
 The Rose Stone - Ralph Nelson Willett
 Brianna - Ralph Nelson Willett
 The Summer Tourist - Ralph Nelson Willett

Spiritual

 Journey To The Cross: Devotions For Lent- Will Walker, Kendal Haug

 Prepare Him Room: Celebrating The Birth of Jesus Family Devotional- Marty Machowski

 Long Story Short: Ten-Minute Devotions To Draw Your Family to God- Marty Machowski

 A Small Book For The Anxious Heart: Meditations on Fear, Worry, and Trust- Edward T. Welch

 Darkest Night Brightest Day: A Family Devotional For The Easter Season- Marty Machowski

 Old Story New: Ten-Minute Devotions To Draw Your Family To God- Marty Machowski

 Who Is Jesus? 40 Pictures To Share With Your Family- Kate Hox

 On Mission: Devotions For Your Short-Term Trip- Patric Knaak

 Wonders Of His Love: Finding Jesus in Isaiah, Family Advent Devotional- Champ Thornton

 Listen Up: 10-Minute Family Devotions on The Parables- Marty Machowski

 Saving Grace: Daily Devotions From Jack Miller- John Miller

 A Small Book For The Hurting Heart: Meditations on Loss, Grief, and Healing- Paul Tautges

Christian fiction series
 Lucid Dreams & Spiritual Warfare series - Maria Isabel Pita - 
 Chronicles of Brothers series - Wendy Alec
 The Jewel series - Hallee Bridgeman
 The Christopher Kiwi series - Gavin Dell and Leigh Dell 
 The Song of Suspense series - Hallee Bridgeman
 The Virtues and Valor series - Hallee Bridgeman
 Treason (Navy Justice series) - Don Brown
 The Miller's Creek novels - Cathy Bryant
 The Book of Bebb series - Frederick Buechner
 The Sight series - David Clement-Davies
 Elyon (The Lost Books series) - Ted Dekker
 Sober Justice (Mike Connolly Mystery series) - Joe Hilley
 Even Now (Lost Love series) - Karen Kingsbury
 The Secret (Seasons of Grace series) - Beverly Lewis
 The Chronicles of Narnia series - C.S. Lewis
 As Sure as the Dawn (Mark of the Lion series) - Francine Rivers
 Paris Encore (Zion Covenant series) - Bodie and Brock Thoene
 Place Called Home series - Lori Wick
 The Lacemaker - Laura Frantz
 SUDDENLY FREE series - Yvette Carmon Davis 
Voice of Joy series - Sarah Floyd

See also
 Christian novel
 List of Christian fiction authors
 List of religious ideas in fantasy fiction

References

 
Lists of novels